Fiser may refer to:

People
 Fišer (feminine: Fišerová), a Czech surname of German origin meaning fisherman
 Amber Fiser, U.S. softball player
 John Calvin Fiser (1838-1876) C. S. A. soldier
 Lud Fiser (1908-1990) U.S., American football and baseball, player and coach
 Paul Fiser (1908-1978) U.S. American football coach

Places
 Fișer (river), a river in Romania; a tributary of the river Cozd
 Fișer, a village in Rupea town, Brașov County, Romania

Other uses
 FiSER (rheometer), an extensional rheometer, see rheometer#FiSER

See also